Abraham Leonardus Appel (30 November 1921 – 31 October 1997) was a Dutch footballer who played as a striker and later a manager.

Playing career

Club
Born in Rotterdam but raised in The Hague, Appel played for local clubs Archipel and Blauw Zwart in the Dutch amateur leagues in the 1930s. He was forced to work in a factory in Berlin, Germany in 1942. The factory where he worked was bombed a year later, and Appel narrowly survived.

During the war, Appel played for Hertha BSC and for an unofficial Dutch national team, made up of Dutch forced labourers. His refusal to give the Hitler salute before matches made the German authorities furious.

The Royal Dutch Football Association suspended Appel after the liberation in 1945. He was, however, a member of the Netherlands national football team at the 1948 Summer Olympics. He left for France in 1949, and became an important player for Stade de Reims where he played alongside Raymond Kopa and Roger Marche. He won the Coupe de France in 1950 and the French national title in 1953. Appel scored 96 goals in 154 matches for Stade Reims.

Appel and Theo Timmermans took the initiative for a charity match for the victims of the North Sea flood of 1953, between France and Dutch footballers playing abroad. The Dutch players won the match 2–1. The match was not an official international, because the Dutch players had been suspended from the Dutch national team. The Royal Dutch Football Association did not allow football players to be professionals. This match, however, paved the way for the acceptance of professional football in the Netherlands. Two years later, the ban on professionalism was lifted

Appel returned to the Netherlands in 1954, having been signed by Fortuna '54 as one of the first professional football players in the Dutch league.

International
Appel made his official debut for the Netherlands in a July 1948 Olympic Games match against Great Britain in which he immediately scored 2 goals. He earned a total of 12 caps, scoring 10 goals.

His final international was an April 1957 friendly match against West Germany.

Managerial career
Appel became a manager in 1960, and won the 1962–63 Eredivisie title as manager of PSV Eindhoven.

References

External links

1921 births
1997 deaths
Footballers from Rotterdam
Association football forwards
Dutch footballers
ADO Den Haag players
Hertha BSC players
Fortuna Sittard players
Stade de Reims players
FC Lausanne-Sport players
Ligue 1 players
Netherlands international footballers
Footballers at the 1948 Summer Olympics
Olympic footballers of the Netherlands
Dutch expatriate footballers
Dutch expatriate sportspeople in Germany
Dutch expatriate sportspeople in Switzerland
Dutch expatriate sportspeople in France
Expatriate footballers in Germany
Expatriate footballers in Switzerland
Expatriate footballers in France
Dutch football managers
FC Lausanne-Sport managers
Fortuna Sittard managers
FC Volendam managers
PSV Eindhoven managers
Eredivisie managers
K. Beringen F.C. managers
Dutch expatriate football managers
Expatriate football managers in Belgium
Expatriate football managers in Switzerland
Dutch real estate brokers
Dutch World War II forced labourers